Numerous current and former law firms are considered notable. Law firms are typically ranked by profit per partner, or at a more general level, revenue. Some private directories also assign subjective rankings to law firms, including Chambers and Partners and The Legal 500, although these are falling out of favour.

Americas
List of Canada-based law firms
List of largest Canada-based law firms by revenue
List of largest United States-based law firms by head count
List of largest United States-based law firms by profits per partner

Europe
List of largest European law firms
List of largest United Kingdom-based law firms

Asia
List of largest Chinese law firms
List of largest Japanese law firms

Africa
Big Five (law firms) in South Africa
List of law firms in Uganda

Global
List of largest law firms by profits per partner

References

Lists of service companies